George Graquitena (born Jorge Graquitena, May 23, 1966), is an American vocalist, drummer and bassist, known for his participation in many south Florida punk and alternative rock bands from the 1980s through the present. He is also known by the stage name of George Van Orsdel.

He was born in Jersey City, New Jersey, where he lived (in West New York, New Jersey) until the age of 5. His family eventually ended up moving to Miami, Florida.
George Graquitena is the vocalist for the south Florida-based psychobilly band The Van Orsdels. He started the band with founding members Todd, David and Bruno. They all adopted the last name "Van Orsdel" as a tribute to The Ramones, as well as a symbol of unity.

Musical career 
Graquitena started playing music when he was 14, specifically bass guitar. The Beatles, more specifically Paul McCartney, were inspirations to him. He played bass in several bands until the age of 21, when he also taught himself to play drums. He switched back and forth between bass guitar and drums for a few years, depending on the band he was in. He spent the first several years (1980–1984) playing in cover bands, playing backyard parties, school talent shows, etc.

1980s 
In the early-mid 1980s, the Miami punk scene was limited to a handful of bands. He started and played drums in a band around 1986, called N.R.K. (which was a mnemonic for the word anarchy), and later the name was changed to The Accused (not to be confused with the famous The Accused; they had selected this name before realizing there was a band by that same name already). The band was very heavily influenced by the "old-school" punk bands, Dead Kennedys, Black Flag, etc. The band was not together for very long. Shortly after, he started playing bass and singing in Not Dead Yet (1986–88), one of Miami's first prominent hardcore punk bands. Not Dead Yet, along with other local bands such as Chocolate Grasshopper, FWA and Cultural Brain Rot helped establish the Miami punk scene at the time. Not Dead Yet was influenced by bands such as Agnostic Front, Youth of Today, 7 Seconds, GBH, and others.

After a couple of years, Not Dead Yet disbanded, and he played drums for the South Florida-based F-Boyz (which later formed Hickey in San Francisco) during 1988–1989. The F-Boyz were known for their stage antics and their brand of what he liked to call "punk mock 'n' roll" (punk rock, with a very tongue-in-cheek take on the genre, basically satirical). They were very heavily influenced by bands such as The Meatmen, Stevie Stiletto, The Misfits, Elvis Presley and even Kiss. The F-Boyz (which later changed their name to Fuckboyz) eventually moved to San Francisco from South Florida, where the band continued to play shows. He left the band and went back to Miami in late 1989.

1990s 
Graquitena took a break for a year, then started singing for a newer band, Jobbernowl. He sang in Jobbernowl from 1990 to 1992. Jobbernowl was a melodic punk band, in the vein of ALL, Descendents, Big Drill Car, etc. The Miami punk scene was flourishing then. The ample amount of "all ages allowed" venues gave them the opportunity to play for younger and larger crowds. Jobbernowl recorded a 7" for Re-Core-Ds records from Germany, and a 10" for Dr. Strange records. They were also featured on a limited edition compilation record on Dr. Strange records, featuring bands like Face To Face, Guttermouth, and others. The band disbanded in 1992.

Graquitena then met ex-members from a Miami band called The Naughty Puritans, and together they started the band Cell 63 (1992–1995) in which Graquitena played drums. Cell 63 was a roots rock/punk band, which was heralded as the "new Replacements".
With influences like Hüsker Dü, Social Distortion, The Replacements, Cell 63 gained a following. They recorded their first self-titled CD, CELL 63, and it was well received post-release. A year and a half later, to follow up the success of their first CD, they recorded and released Once Upon A Drunk. Their second CD was even more well received than the first. Cell 63 toured the East Coast of the United States for 2 weeks to promote the CD. Shortly after the tour, they disbanded.

After the demise of Cell 63, Rob Coe (singer/guitarist for Cell 63) and Graquitena decided to start a new band, Fay Wray(1996). Fay Wray was composed of ex-members of Quit and Cell 63. Graquitena played drums for the band for a little over a year until the band broke up in 1997 (only to reform a year later with a new drummer and bassist). The band released 2 CDs on Gainesville's No Idea record label. It had a distinct "Gainesville" sound (like that of other Gainesville bands such as Radon, Spoke, etc.), although 3 of the 4 members were based out of Miami.

2000s 
After Fay Wray, Graquitena took some time off again. In 2000, he started playing drums in a Miami
street punk band called Torpedo Lucas, who was very heavily influenced by bands such as Rancid, Social Distortion, and many others. The band recorded 2 E.P. CDs within the course of 2 years.  Eventually Torpedo Lucas broke up in 2002 after some line-up difficulties.

In October 2002, Graquitena organized a Misfits tribute band called The Braineaters, complete with stage props and Crimson Ghost. It was a one-show band, which was something Graquitena had always wanted to do. Graquitena partnered with Todd and David (who later became part of the original Van Orsdels line-up) and Brian from Underpaid.

After The Braineaters project, Todd, David and Graquitena formed The Van Orsdels (2003).
The Van Orsdels had the distinction of being south Florida's very first psychobilly band. The band members all adopted the last name of "Van Orsdel", in honor of The Ramones, and to portray a sense of unity. In 2003, The Van Orsdels recorded a 7-song E.P. CD, titled "Ain't Life a Drag?" which was well received. In 2005, the Van Orsdels signed to Crazy Love records and released their second CD, (their first full-length release) "Miami Morgue Riot!" which established the band on a global scale. In August 2005, The Van Orsdels decided to do their first tour, so they booked a short East Coast tour. The band has several projects coming soon, including songs that will be featured in an upcoming independent horror film Shadow Grove.

In 2007, Graquitena recorded a song for the Gris Grimly DVD release of his debut film Cannibal Flesh Riot!. The DVD was released featuring a bonus CD which included songs inspired by the movie. Graquitena's contribution was a song titled "The Ballad of Stash and Hub". He has also recorded some acoustic songs with The Van Orsdels, which were featured on the CD "Leftovers." "The Ballad of Stash and Hub" was also featured on the "Leftovers" CD. Graquitena has also made several solo acoustic recordings, which have not yet been released. Due to the inactivity of The Van Orsdels as of 2010, Graquitena began writing and recording music for a solo project called The Family Ghouls, a horrorpunk project which consists of Graquitena writing and performing the songs under the name "Vincent Van Ghoul", playing all the instruments, and performing all the vocals. As of April 2010, several songs have been released as demo versions on The Family Ghouls' official MySpace page. Also as of April 2010, the future of The Van Orsdels is uncertain, as the band still remain on hiatus.

On August 11, 2010, Graquitena posted a blog on The Van Orsdels' official MySpace page stating that the band officially disbanded. There was an indication that there may be a Van Orsdels reunion show in the future.

Selected discography 
Appears on:
 Wake Up And Smell The Coffee – Not Dead Yet (CS) 1987 (on bass guitar and lead vocals)
 Those Damn Kids! – Not Dead Yet(CS) 1987 (on bass guitar and lead vocals)
 Rock N' Roll Problem – F-Boyz (vinyl) Truth About Fonzie 1990 (on drums)
 Static Head – Jobbernowl (vinyl) Re-Core-Ds records 1992 (on vocals)
 CELL 63 – Cell 63 (CD) Cellout Records 1993 (on drums and backing vocals)
 Once Upon A drunk... – Cell 63 (CD) Cellout Records 1994 (performing on drums, backing vocals, organ, acoustic guitar)
 Fay Wray – Fay Wray (CD) No Idea Records 1996 (on drums and backing vocals)
 Self-Propelled – Torpedo Lucas (CD) Cuppa Joe records 2001 (on drums and backing vocals)
 Take Your Turn – Torpedo Lucas (CD) Cuppa Joe records 2002 (on drums, backing and lead vocals)
 Ain't Life A Drag? – The Van Orsdels (CD) Cuppa Joe Records 2003 (on vocals)
 Miami Morgue Riot! – The Van Orsdels (CD) Crazy Love records 2005 (on vocals)
Cannibal Flesh Riot!:The Jams – (as George Van Orsdel, on "The Ballad of Stash and Hub") (CD) Mad Creator Productions 2007
Leftovers – The Van Orsdels (CD) TVO Skeletunes Records 2007 (on vocals)
Psychobilly Christmas – The Van Orsdels (on "You're a mean one, Mr. Grinch") (CD) Cleopatra Records 2008
Rockabilly & Psychobilly Madness – The Van Orsdels (on "Grenade") (2-CD set) Cleopatra Records 2011

References

External links
 The Van Orsdels' Official Website
 Matty Luv tribute website, guitarist for The F-Boyz. Describes a history of The F-Boyz (also known as Fuckboyz)

Psychobilly musicians
American punk rock musicians
Musicians from Florida
People from West New York, New Jersey
Living people
1966 births